DHL Aviation is a division of DHL (owned by Deutsche Post) responsible for providing air transport capacity. It is not a single airline but a group of airlines that are either owned, co-owned or chartered by DHL Express.

Overview
DHL currently owns six main airlines, which provide services in various global regions:

European Air Transport Leipzig (EAT Leipzig) is responsible for the major part of the network for Europe, and for long-haul services to the Middle East and Africa. It operates a fleet of Boeing and Airbus freighters from its hub at the Leipzig/Halle Airport .
DHL Air UK (DHL Air), acquired by DHL in 1989, is based at East Midlands Airport. Since 2000, it has operated a fleet of Boeing 757 Freighters on intra-European services and a fleet of Boeing 767 freighters, primarily on transatlantic routes.
DHL Aero Expreso is a subsidiary in the Central and South America Hub in Tocumen, Panamá, operating a fleet of Boeing 737-400, 757-200 and 767-300 freighters which also serve destinations in the Caribbean and Florida.
SNAS/DHL (DHL International) handles Middle East destinations from its headquarters and main regional hub at Bahrain International Airport, operating a fleet of Boeing 767 freighters. The fleet is deployed throughout the Middle East and in Africa.
Blue Dart Aviation is based at Chennai International Airport, India, with a fleet of Boeing 757 freighters. It provides services for DHL's Indian network and regional charters.
DHL Air Austria is based at Vienna International Airport, Austria, with a fleet of Boeing 757 freighters.

DHL also owns the following smaller subsidiary airlines:
DHL de Guatemala, Guatemala City
DHL Ecuador, Guayaquil, Ecuador
DHL Aviation South Africa, Johannesburg, South Africa, with a fleet of ATR 72-200F operated by Solenta Aviation.

 DHL had stakes in the following airlines, some of which also operate under the DHL brand or livery:

 AeroLogic, Leipzig, Germany (50%).
 Polar Air Cargo, Purchase, New York, United States (49%).
 Tasman Cargo Airlines, Sydney, Australia (49%).
Vensecar Internacional, Caracas, Venezuela (49%).

Former owned airlines:
 Air Hong Kong sold the remaining 40% shares to Cathay Pacific Airways in 2017.

In 2021, DHL Aviation announced the relocation of one of its main hub operations from Bergamo to Milan Malpensa Airport, where it opened new logistics facilities.

Fleet

See also 
 2003 Baghdad DHL attempted shootdown incident
2002 Überlingen mid-air collision

References

External links

DHL Express Division - Aviations

DHL
Airline holding companies
Cargo airlines
Transport companies established in 1969